KISS Communications Limited is an ISO 9001 certified, creative agency based in Cambridge, UK. KISS Communications are a strategy-led agency who integrate advertising, branding, digital and public relations services, and work with companies in industries such as Healthcare, Science, Technology, Agriculture, Education and Research & Development.

Background
The company was established in 2007 by Simon Fryer (CEO) and Richard Bland (former Creative Director).

Kiss maintain a ‘keep it simple’ philosophy which underpins their approach when working with clients. KISS Communications also set up the regional Young People of the Year awards (YOPEYs), which recognises community-spirited young people who go the extra mile. On 2 June 2015 KISS Communications joined PROI Worldwide, as part of its global network of integrated communications companies. In 2022, they merged with Ely-based Isle Interactive, creating a team of over 30 staff servicing clients.

Awards
KISS Communications were voted No. 1 in Business Weekly’s New Year’s Honours ‘Image Makers’ award in 2011, 2012, 2013, 2014, 2015.

References

2007 establishments in the United Kingdom
Companies based in Cambridge
Research and development in the United Kingdom